The 2010 Crown Royal Presents the Heath Calhoun 400 was a NASCAR Sprint Cup Series stock car race held on May 1, 2010 at Richmond International Raceway in Richmond, Virginia. Contested over 400 laps, it was the tenth race of the 2010 Sprint Cup Series season. The race was won by Kyle Busch for the Joe Gibbs Racing team. Jeff Gordon finished second, and Kevin Harvick, who started seventh, clinched third.

Pole position driver Kyle Busch maintained the lead after the start of the race. Kyle Busch would eventually lead to the race high of 226 laps. Afterward, Gordon became the leader during the final laps. He remained the leader until Kyle Busch passed him with four laps remaining. Kyle Busch crossed the finish line first to clinch his first win of the season, and his third at Richmond International Raceway.

There were six caution flags and twelve lead changes among eight different drivers throughout the course of the race. The result moved Kyle Busch up two spots to third in the Drivers' Championship, 109 points behind of leader Kevin Harvick and ten ahead of Matt Kenseth. Chevrolet maintained its lead in the Manufacturers' Championship, eighteen points ahead of Toyota and thirty ahead of Ford, with twenty-six races remaining in the season.

Race report

Background

Richmond International Raceway is one of  five short tracks to hold NASCAR races, the others being Bristol Motor Speedway, Dover International Speedway, Martinsville Speedway, and Phoenix International Raceway. The track's turns are banked at fourteen degrees. The front stretch, the location of the finish line, is banked at eight degrees while the back stretch has two degrees of banking. The racetrack has seats for 97,912 spectators.

Before the race, Jimmie Johnson led the Drivers' Championship with 1,323 points, while Kevin Harvick stood in second with 1,297 points. Greg Biffle was third in the Drivers' Championship with 1,237 points, Matt Kenseth was fourth with 1,224 points, and Kyle Busch was in fifth with 1,163 points. In the Manufacturers' Championship, Chevrolet was leading with seventy points, twenty-one points ahead of their rival Toyota. Ford, with forty-two points, was four points ahead of Dodge in the battle for third.

Practices and qualifying
Two practice sessions were held on Friday before the Saturday race. In the first session, the fastest drivers were Jamie McMurray, Clint Bowyer, Joey Logano, Dale Earnhardt Jr., and Kyle Busch. During the second practice session, Kyle Busch, David Reutimann, Logano, Juan Pablo Montoya, and Jeff Gordon had the quickest times.

During qualifying, forty-six cars were entered, but Michael McDowell, Max Papis, and Dave Blaney did not qualify; NASCAR's qualifying procedure only allow forty-three cars to make the race. Kyle Busch clinched the pole position with a fastest lap time of 21.247 seconds. He was joined on the front row of the grid by Reutimann. Johnson qualified third, Gordon took fourth, and Newman started fifth.

Race summary

The race, the tenth out of a total of thirty-six in the season, began at 7:30 p.m. EDT and was televised live in the United States on Fox. Joe Ellison, from Essex Village Community Church, began pre-race ceremonies, by giving the invocation. Next, the Commandants own United States Marine Drum and Bugle performed the national anthem, and Heath Calhoun gave the command for drivers to start their engines.

Kyle Busch held the lead going through the first corner with David Reutimann behind him. One lap later, Jeff Gordon moved into the third position. On lap 6, Gordon emerged in second, after passing Reutimann. Jimmie Johnson, who had started third, fell to fourth by lap 7. By lap 8, Kyle Busch had a lead of 1.5 seconds. One lap later, Kevin Harvick moved into fourth, after passing Johnson. On lap 18, Harvick moved into third, as Jamie McMurray moved to the sixth position. Six laps later, Reutimann had fallen to the fourth position, after starting second. By lap 35, Gordon had caught Kyle Busch for the first position, but after six laps he was two seconds behind Kyle Busch. On lap 42, the first caution came out because Joe Nemechek collided with the wall after suffering a blown tire. During this caution, drivers made there pit stops. On lap 49, Kyle Busch led on the restart.

Afterward, Gordon moved into the third position, after passing Jamie McMurray. By lap 55, Juan Pablo Montoya had moved from nineteenth to eighth. On lap 59, Harvick moved into second, but four laps later, Gordon passed him for the second position. By lap 66, Kyle Busch had a 2.3 second lead over Gordon. After starting tenth, Clint Bowyer had moved to the fifth position by lap 68. Kyle Busch remained the leader until green flag pit stops began. On lap 143, Jeff Gordon received the lead, as Kyle Busch made a pit stop. Two laps later, Kyle Busch reclaimed the lead. On lap 153, the second caution came out because of debris. Kyle Busch, again, led the field to the restart. Ten laps later, on lap 170, the third caution came out because of debris. Ryan Newman, because of a two tire change, was in the lead on the restart. On lap 177, one lap after the restart, Kyle Busch took the lead away from Newman.

Kyle Busch kept the lead until Jeff Burton passed him on lap 230. Burton led only twenty laps before Jeff Gordon claimed the lead. Jeff Gordon made a pit stop on lap 266, allowing Kevin Harvick to pass him. Green flag pit stops continued, as Carl Edwards received the lead on lap 268. Three laps later Tony Stewart passed Edwards for the lead. On lap 272, Jeff Gordon reclaimed the lead. By this time, the race was under green flag conditions for 102 laps, but the green flag run only continued until lap 367, 265 laps after the last restart, when the fourth caution came out. The cause for the caution was that Elliott Sadler had a tire that blew. On lap 377, Jeff Gordon led the field toward the green flag. Two laps later, though, the fifth caution, caused by a spin from Sam Hornish Jr., came out.

On lap 385, Jeff Gordon led the field to the green flag. Four laps later Hornish Jr. spun and collided with the inside wall, to bring out the sixth caution. Jeff Gordon, on lap 395, led toward the restart. With four laps remaining, Kyle Busch passed Gordon for the lead. Busch kept the lead to win his first race in 2010.

Post-race

Kyle Busch appeared in victory lane after his victory lap to start celebrating his first win of the season, and his third at Richmond International Raceway. Following his win, he added, "I don’t even remember what just happened. I drove it down into Turn 1 and hoped it stuck. I knew I had to baby it into Turn 3 and finally got to clear Jeff. We set sail there from there."

After finishing second, Jeff Gordon stated, "A little disappointed again that we are coming up short, but we are getting plenty of practice. It’s a little disappointing we haven’t won some races yet. If we keep doing this, those will come. We’ve got to keep putting ourselves in position." Gordon followed the race by saying, "I’ve been doing this long enough to know that they don’t give out trophies for leading any lap other than the last one." In the subsequent press conference, Kyle Busch said, "I can’t thank Dave enough, it’s unbelievable to be back in victory lane. A lot of people doubted what we were doing, but I never did." Gordon stated:

Dave Rogers, Kyle Busch's crew chief, stated, "It would have been great to keep that many cars a lap down, but it would have been selfish. Everybody behind us was going to pit. If we stay out, we keep all those guys down. Then the seven guys behind us are going to drive by us, we’re going to lose our track position just to keep cars a lap down. It’s not worth it." The race result moved Kevin Harvick in the lead for the Driver's Championship with 1,467 points. Jimmie Johnson, who finished tenth, was second on 1,457, ninety-nine points ahead of Kyle Busch and 149 ahead of Matt Kenseth. Greg Biffle was fifth with 1,334 points. In the Manufacturers' Championship, Chevrolet maintained their lead with 76 points. Toyota maintained second with 58 points. Ford followed with 46 points, six points ahead of Dodge in fourth.

Results

Qualifying

Race Results

Standings after the race

Drivers' Championship standings

Manufacturers' Championship standings

Note: Only the top five positions are included for both sets of standings.

References

2010 in sports in Virginia
2010 NASCAR Sprint Cup Series
May 2010 sports events in the United States
2010 Crown Royal Presents the Heath Calhoun 400